Yulia Borisovna Navalnaya (born 24 July 1976) is a Russian public figure, economist and the wife of the Russian opposition leader Alexei Navalny. She has been described in media as the "First Lady" of the Russian opposition.

Biography

Early years 
Navalnaya was born Yulia Borisovna Abrosimova on 24 July 1976 in Moscow, Soviet Union, in the family of scientist Boris Aleksandrovich Abrosimov (1952—1996). Her mother worked for the Ministry of Light Industry; her parents divorced when Navalnaya was in fifth grade, and her mother married a second time, to an employee of the USSR State Planning Committee. In 2020, journalist Oleg Kashin said that Navalnaya's father is the currently living Boris Borisovich Abrosimov, the secretary of the Russian embassy in Great Britain, associated with the special services, and her aunt is Elena Borisovna Abrosimova, one of the authors of the Russian constitution. Navalny, in response to this, published a death certificate for his father-in-law, dated 1996.

Navalnaya graduated from the Faculty of International Economic Relations of the Plekhanov Russian Economic Academy, later did an internship abroad, studied in graduate school, and worked for some time in a Moscow banks.

In the summer of 1998, while on vacation in Turkey, Navalnaya met Alexei Navalny, a lawyer, also a resident of Moscow. In 2000, she and Navalny got married, and she later gave birth to two childrendaughter Daria (2001) and son Zakhar (2008). She helped her husband's parents in their business related to basket weaving. After 2007, Navalnaya did not officially work anywhere, calling herself "the main one in matters of everyday life and raising children". In 2000, Navalnaya, together with her husband, joined the Yabloko party, which she left in May 2011.

Involvement in Alexei Navalny's political career 

After 2007, Alexei Navalny gained fame in Russia as a blogger and opposition politician. Navalnaya became the first secretary and assistant to her husband. The family's life became noticeably more public, so that Navalnaya was in the spotlight as the "first lady of the Russian opposition". Observers note that she never tried to position herself as an independent figure: Navalnaya always behaves like a devoted wife and companion ("the Decembrist's wife"), ready for harsh statements and decisive actions if her husband needs it, but not directly related to politics. She spoke at a number of rallies; she called the head of the National Guard of Russia Viktor Zolotov, who in September 2018 challenged Alexei Navalny to a "duel", as a "thief, coward and impudent bandit". 

Navalnaya attracted close public attention in the late summer and early fall of 2020, when her husband was urgently hospitalized in Omsk, Russia on suspicion of poisoning. She demanded that Navalny be released to Germany for treatment, and even turned directly to Russian President Vladimir Putin. After German experts confirmed Navalny's poisoning, Russian physician Leonid Roshal said that no poisonous substance was found in Navalny's samples in Russia and suggested creating a Russian-German team on this matter. Navalnaya accused him of acting "not as a doctor, but as the voice of the state." She followed her husband to Berlin, was next to him at the Charité hospital, and Navalny later posted a message "Yulia, you saved me". Novaya Gazeta and its audience named Navalnaya its 2020 Hero of the Year. Key European media outlets closely followed her activity and quoted her posts on social networks.

In January 2021, Navalnaya returned to Russia with her husband. After Navalny was detained at the border control, she made a statement that the arrest and the closure of the airport in Vnukovo were a manifestation of the Russian authorities' fear of Navalny. "Alexei said that he is not afraid", she said. "— And I'm not afraid either. And I urge you all not to be afraid." Later, Navalnaya accused the security officials of "persecut[ing] [her] as the wife of an enemy of the people." She wrote on Instagram: "The Year of '37 has come, and we did not notice." On 21 January, Navalnaya announced that she would go attend the 2021 Russian protests to demand the release of her husband. On 23 January, she was detained, but released the same evening.

Possible political future 

In 2015, Navalnaya was ranked 67th in the top hundred most influential women in Russia by Echo of Moscow. After Alexei Navalny received a suspended sentence, the opinion was expressed that Navalnaya could nominate herself for the presidency instead of him. According to Russian public figure Ksenia Sobchak, in 2018 she offered this option to Navalny, but he rejected it saying "votes are not handed over". 

In September 2020, after the poisoning of Navalny, opinions began to appear that Navalnaya is now beginning to play an independent political role and may become the "Russian Tsikhanouskaya" — the leader of the entire opposition. Political analyst Konstantin Kalachev said that Navalnaya's role has changed: "From the wife of a politician, she is herself becoming a politician"; "she has charisma and charm, and can easily replace her husband if necessary". Political strategist Abbas Gallyamov compared Navalnaya to Corazon Aquino, the wife of the main opposition leader in the Philippines who opposed the regime of the dictator that ruled for twenty years. There are also opinions that such a turn of events is unlikely.

In January 2021, the pro-Kremlin channel Tsargrad TV threatened to publish intimate files of Alexei Navalny unless Navalnaya promised "not to become Tsikhanouskaya in Russia" and "not to play political games". 

Russian writer Dmitry Bykov said that Navalnaya reminds him of the heroine of Lyudmila Petrushevskaya: she "faces circumstances stronger than her, but some miracle helps her to defeat the world's evil."

References

External links 
 Yulia Navalnaya's blog on the website of the radio station Echo of Moscow (since 2018).
  — speech at a rally on Sakharov Avenue on September 6, 2013.
  — interview on channel vDud, October 5, 2020.

1976 births
Living people
Alexei Navalny
Russian activists against the 2022 Russian invasion of Ukraine
Plekhanov Russian University of Economics alumni
Russian activists
Economists from Moscow
Russian prisoners and detainees
Russian women economists